OFK Federal is a defunct Montenegrin football club based in the town of Ulcinj. OFK Federal played their matches at their Stadion Safari.

Federal started as a football club for juniors in 2008, but on 1 October, 2010 they were officially registered as a club. In 2013, it was created the senior team and in 2014 the club was officially dissolved.

Players

Final squad 
As of 12 September 2013

Record

2013-14 Montenegrin Third League

2013-14 Playoffs to Montenegrin Second League

2013 Kupa e Pavarsisë

Notes

External links 
OFK Federal at Facebook

Sport in Ulcinj
Federal Ulcinj